The Islamic City Council of Isfahan is the directly elected council that presides over the city of Isfahan and elects the Mayor of Isfahan in a mayor–council government system.

Members

References

External links
 

Isfahan
Isfahan
1999 establishments in Iran